Kerr–Schild perturbations are a special type of perturbation to a spacetime metric which only appear linearly in the Einstein field equations which describe general relativity. They were found by Roy Kerr and Alfred Schild in 1965.

Form
It can be shown that any perturbation of this form will only appear quadratically in the Einstein equations, and only linearly if the condition , where  is a scalar, is imposed.

Applications
While the form of the perturbation may appear very restrictive, there are several black hole metrics which can be written in Kerr–Schild form, such as Schwarzschild (stationary black hole),  Kerr (rotating), Reissner–Nordström (charged) and Kerr–Newman (both charged and rotating).

References

General relativity